Marco Kana (born 8 August 2002) is a footballer who currently plays as a defender for RSC Anderlecht in the Belgian First Division A. Born in DR Congo, Kana represents Belgium internationally.

International career
RSC Anderlecht

Kana was born in the DR Congo, and moved to Belgium at a young age. He is a youth international for Belgium and playing for R.S.C. Anderlecht.

Career statistics

References

External links

2002 births
Living people
Footballers from Kinshasa
Belgian footballers
Belgium youth international footballers
Democratic Republic of the Congo footballers
Democratic Republic of the Congo emigrants to Belgium
R.S.C. Anderlecht players
Belgian Pro League players
Association football defenders
Black Belgian sportspeople